The Nigerian Air Force Regiment (NAF Regiment) is component of the Nigerian Air Force that serves as a specialist airfield and defense corps.

Operations 
They serve to defend NAF bases, airfields and aircraft as well as protect VIPs. After the attacks by Boko Haram on Nigerian Air Force installations during their insurgency, the command decided to create a specialist unit capable of providing security and protecting the Air Force interests and its bases across the country, in especially conflict zones like the North East, Maiduguri. The regiment is currently operating in internal security operations in 14 states. In early 2021, seven NAF Regiment servicemen died in an ambush by 100 terrorists in Kaduna State.

Structure 

 VIP Protection Squad
 Special Operations Force
 Regiment Training Centre
 Quick Response Force (QRF)

Quick Response Force 
The Quick Response Force (QRF) is a unit in the regiment capable of the quick deployment of its forces to provide counter-terrorism and security for various Nigerian Air Force installations, such as bases, military assets from which the Air Force operates from. These security forces consist of elite military units such as special operations or paratroopers which are trained at a higher combat level than the regular military units.

Training 
Its training and nature of operations are equivalent to the RAF Regiment of Great Britain, the training was undertaken by the British Military Advisory and Training Team (BMATT). They also train in various countries such as Belarus, China and Pakistan.

See also 
 Sri Lanka Air Force Regiment
 USAF Security Forces
 Paskhas

References 

Military units and formations of Nigeria
Nigerian Air Force
Airborne units and formations